Diadegma alpicola is a wasp first described by Smits van Burgst in 1914. No subspecies are listed.

References

alpicola
Insects described in 1914